Robert Alexander Bacon (born 8 February 1989) is a former English professional footballer who played as a forward. He was the Club’s Soccer Chairman from 2018 to 2022. He previously played cricket for the Hong Kong National Team.

Career statistics

Club

Notes

References

External links
 Yau Yee Football League profile
 
  ESPN Cricinfo profile

Living people
1989 births
English footballers
Association football forwards
Hong Kong First Division League players
Hong Kong Premier League players
Hong Kong FC players
English expatriate footballers
English expatriate sportspeople in Hong Kong
Expatriate footballers in Hong Kong